Kemberton is a village and civil parish located in Shropshire, England. The population of the civil parish at the 2011 Census was 244.

See also
Listed buildings in Kemberton

References

External links

Civil parishes in Shropshire
Villages in Shropshire